Aama is a village development committee in Rupandehi District in Lumbini Province of southern Nepal. At the time of the 1991 Nepal census, it had a population of 3456 people living in 582 individual households. A farming village and community, Aama is located to the south of Lumbini.

References

Populated places in Rupandehi District